Divellomelon is a genus of air-breathing land snails, terrestrial pulmonate gastropod mollusks in the family Camaenidae.

Species 
Species within the genus Divellomelon include:
 Divellomelon hillieri

References 

 
Camaenidae
Taxonomy articles created by Polbot